St Andrew's Church is a Gothic church building at Andreasstraße (Andrew Street) in the historical centre of the city of Erfurt in Thuringia, Germany. The surrounding quarter Andreasviertel and the northern district Andreasvorstadt are named after it. St Andrew's Church is now a Lutheran parish church.

History 
St Andrew's Church was first mentioned in a document in 1182. In 1210, the construction of a new church began, which was completed around 1370. A fire destroyed the church in 1416; it was rebuilt in the later course of the 15th century. Around 1830, the building was modified. It has a flat ceiling with a pointed barrel; a crucifixion relief from around 1370 is emblazoned above the southern main entrance. A stone relief dating from 1450 shows the motif of the Lamentation of Christ. The Reformation was introduced in 1522; since then, St Andrew's Church has been Protestant. In 1604, it merged with the neighbouring congregation of St Maurice's and in 1973 with the congregation of St Michael's Church. Since 1727, a wooden model of the epitaph for Martin Luther has been in St Andrew's Church.

Organ 
Johann Rudolph Ahle was the cantor at a predecessor instrument in the 17th century, which was built by Johann Georg Kummer from Dachwig. The present organ was built in 1987–1989 by the company Mitteldeutscher Orgelbau A. Voigt from Bad Liebenwerda in the historical organ case from 1787, partly reusing pipe material from the predecessor organ. The instrument has 25 stops on two manuals and pedal. The actions are mechanical.

References

External links 

 Website of the parish

Andrew
Erfurt Andrew
Gothic architecture in Germany
15th-century churches in Germany
Lutheran churches converted from Roman Catholicism
16th-century Lutheran churches in Germany